It's All Right! is an album by the saxophonist Teddy Edwards which was recorded in 1967 and released on the Prestige label.

Reception

AllMusic awarded the album 3 stars stating, "Although the music (mostly Edwards originals) is essentially hard bop, there are hints of the avant-garde here and there in the harmonies and solos... Edwards would not have an opportunity to record as a leader for another seven years, but the largely straight-ahead music has dated pretty well."

The authors of The Penguin Guide to Jazz Recordings wrote: "some of the material points in the direction of Coltrane and even Ornette Coleman; though never remotely avant-garde, Teddy knew what was happening on the scene... he was able to combine his usual easy, blues-inflected swing with something harder and darker."

Writing for DownBeat, Dan Morgenstern commented: "The session was perfectly cast, and it adds up to a generous helping of well-crafted, well-played contemporary jazz without convenient labels... All told, a feather in Edwards'... cap."

Track listing 
All compositions by Teddy Edwards
 "It's All Right" - 5:18  
 "Going Home" - 5:00  
 "Afraid of Love" - 5:05  
 "Wheelin' and Dealin'" - 6:53  
 "Mamacita Lisa" - 4:24  
 "Back Alley Blues" - 4:29  
 "The Cellar Dweller" - 4:54  
 "Moving In" - 5:58

Personnel 
Teddy Edwards - tenor saxophone
Jimmy Owens - trumpet, flugelhorn
Garnett Brown - trombone
Cedar Walton - piano
Ben Tucker - double bass
Lenny McBrowne - drums

References 

Teddy Edwards albums
1967 albums
Prestige Records albums
Albums produced by Don Schlitten